Sirari may refer to:

 Sirari, a town in northern Tanzania
 Sirari, Bihar, a village in Sheikhpura district of Bihar, India
 Sirari (got), a got (subclan) among the Punjabi Mahtam
 Sirari (tree), a South American hardwood

See also
 Ari Gold (musician) known as "Sir Ari"